George Hamilton-Gordon, 6th Earl of Aberdeen (10 December 1841 – 27 January 1870), styled Lord Haddo from 1860 to 1864, was a Scottish peer and sailor.

Hamilton-Gordon settled for a time in Richmond, Maine, where he took jobs cutting ice and clerking at a store (where it is reported he lost his temper at being fired and told his employer that he "could buy and sell him many times over" before storming out). As a sailor, he often shipped out of Richmond, and at one time captained a small ship called the Walton (or Waltham). His profession was not entirely a mystery to his family at home, as he wrote letters to his mother and brother on occasion. 

Travelling from Boston to Melbourne on the Hera in 1870, Lord Aberdeen was washed overboard during a violent storm and drowned. It was reported he was swept away when attempting to take down the boom sail, which he could have ordered another man to do.
 His younger brother had been killed in a rifle accident two years earlier, so Aberdeen was succeeded by his next younger brother, John.

References

External links

Scottish sailors
People lost at sea
Nobility from Edinburgh
Deaths by drowning
06
03
1841 births
1870 deaths
People from Richmond, Maine